Cyphocharax festivus is a species of fish in the family Curimatidae native to South America.

References

Curimatidae
Fish of South America
Taxa named by Richard Peter Vari
Fish described in 1992